Liam Watts (born 8 July 1990) is an English professional rugby league footballer who plays as a  for the Castleford Tigers in the Super League. He is an England Knights international.

He has previously played in the Super League for Hull Kingston Rovers and Hull F.C., and in the Championship on loan at Gateshead Thunder and Doncaster.

Background
Watts was born in Featherstone, West Yorkshire, England, and he was a junior at Featherstone Lions.

Career

Castleford Tigers 
Watts made his first team debut and scored a try for the Castleford Tigers in an 88-10 victory over Castleford Lock Lane in the Challenge Cup third round on 11 March 2007.

Hull Kingston Rovers
He made his Hull Kingston Rovers debut in a Challenge Cup fourth round tie in April 2008, and signed a two-year contract until the end of the 2010 season in June 2008. 

After a fine season in 2010 in which Watts played 26 of 27 Super League matches, he was called up to the England training squad for the Four Nations Championship in September 2010, and awarded the 2010 Albert Goldthorpe Rookie of the Year Medal.

Gateshead Thunder
In 2009 he spent time on loan from Hull KR at Gateshead Thunder in League 1.

Hull FC
Watts requested to be released from his contract with Hull Kingston Rovers in June 2012, and joined Hull F.C. on a three-and-a-half-year contract. Hull coach Peter Gentle said: "Liam is certainly a promising player for the future and we are looking forward to helping him realise his potential".  He signed a new three-year contract in July 2014, and a further two-year contract in March 2017.

He won the Challenge Cup with Hull in 2016 and 2017 at Wembley Stadium.

Doncaster
He spent time on loan from Hull, playing for Doncaster in 2014.

Castleford Tigers
Watts signed for Castleford Tigers on a three-year deal in March 2018. Hull had agreed a fee with Championship side Toronto Wolfpack, but Castleford's "last-minute significant offer" saw him return to Wheldon Road. He made 23 appearances in his first year.

Watts had an outstanding personal season in 2019, playing in all but 2 of Castleford's games and earning a place in the Super League Dream Team. At the club's end of season awards, he was named Player of the Year and Players' Player of the Year, and won the inaugural Immortals Award voted for by Castleford legends. He was also named as the Castleford Tigers Supporters Club player of the year.

He signed a three-year extension until the end of the 2023 season in July 2019.

On 17 July 2021, he played for Castleford in their 2021 Challenge Cup Final loss against St. Helens.

International career

England Knights
Watts played for the England Knights in 2011.

England
Good performances for Castleford saw Watts called up for the England Performance squad in March 2019.

England 9s
He was selected in England 9s squad for the 2019 Rugby League World Cup 9s.

References

External links

Profile at castlefordtigers.com
(archived by web.archive.org) Profile at hullfc.com
(archived by web.archive.org) Profile at hullkr.co.uk
Profile at superleague.co.uk

1990 births
Living people
Castleford Tigers players
Doncaster R.L.F.C. players
England Knights national rugby league team players
English rugby league players
Hull F.C. players
Hull Kingston Rovers players
Newcastle Thunder players
Rugby league props
Rugby league players from Featherstone